Marlen Papava (born 23 April 1941,died 19 April 2010) is a Soviet sports shooter. He competed in the men's 50 metre free pistol event at the 1976 Summer Olympics.

References

1941 births
Living people
Soviet male sport shooters
Olympic shooters of the Soviet Union
Shooters at the 1976 Summer Olympics
Sportspeople from Sukhumi